Chemult station is an Amtrak train station in Chemult, Oregon. It is not staffed and only consists of a platform structure and a warming shelter, which replaced a smaller structure in 2010.

History
Chemult was originally a station on the Southern Pacific Cascade Line, with regular service by the Klamath and limited service by the Cascade. The station became a stop on the Coast Starlight in 1980.

A new Chemult station was built on the site in 2010. The old structure, which was uninsulated and therefore too hot in the summer and too cold in the winter, had been the subject of much criticism for being too small. The new station cost $600,000 and was built in the Cascadian architecture style. Construction began in May 2010 and was completed in November, in time for a November 10 opening.

References

External links

Amtrak Stations Database

Amtrak stations in Oregon
Transportation buildings and structures in Klamath County, Oregon
Railway stations in the United States opened in 1980
1980 establishments in Oregon
2010 establishments in Oregon
Former Southern Pacific Railroad stations in Oregon